EM-5854 is a steroidal antiandrogen which was under development by Endoceutics, Inc. (formerly Endorecherche, Inc.) for the treatment of prostate cancer. It was first described in a patent in 2008, and was further characterized in 2012. EM-5854 reached phase I/II clinical trials for the treatment of prostate cancer but development was discontinued in March 2019.

The drug acts as a potent and selective competitive antagonist of the androgen receptor (AR). Unlike other steroidal antiandrogens like cyproterone acetate, but similarly to nonsteroidal antiandrogens like bicalutamide and enzalutamide, EM-5854 is a pure or silent antagonist of the AR and shows no intrinsic partial androgenic activity. They also show dramatically increased antiandrogenic potency relative to bicalutamide in in vivo assays. On the basis of the available research, it has been said that EM-5854 may possibly have 70- to 140-fold the antiandrogenic potency of bicalutamide in humans. EM-5854 and EM-5855 show little to no affinity for other steroid hormone receptors including the estrogen, progesterone, and glucocorticoid receptors. EM-5854 bears a cyano phenyl group, the structural motif of the nonsteroidal antiandrogens.

References

External links
 EM-5854 - AdisInsight
 Research programme: androgen receptor antagonists (EM-4350, EM-5855, EM-6537) - AdisInsight

Abandoned drugs
Tertiary alcohols
Estranes
Experimental cancer drugs
Fluoroarenes
Hormonal antineoplastic drugs
Nitriles
Prostate cancer
Pyridinium compounds
Steroidal antiandrogens